Madrasta is a 1996 Philippine family drama film directed by Olivia Lamasan, written by Olivia Lamasan and Ricky Lee, and starring Sharon Cuneta and Christopher de Leon. The film clinched Cuneta a Grandslam Best Actress honor, recognized her as Best Actress from all major award-giving bodies in the Philippines, while its strong showing at the box-office conferred to Cuneta, another Box-Office Queen award.

The Star Cinema produced drama was Cuneta's first movie outside her home studio of more than twenty years, Viva Films. This is also the reunion movie with Christopher de Leon, and with Eula Valdez from Bukas Luluhod ang mga Tala and Buy One, Take One, and with Teresa Loyzaga from Kung Kailangan Mo Ako. Madrasta had its Asian TV screening via the movie channel Cinemax. The film has been digitally remastered and restored by ABS-CBN Film Archives and Central Digital Lab.

Synopsis
The loving and nurturing Mariel (Sharon Cuneta) marries Edward (Christopher de Leon) after his first wife abandons him and took responsibility as a mother to his three children (Claudine Barretto, Patrick Garcia and Camille Prats). Mariel strives to win the acceptance and affection of her new stepchildren. Even as she tries to define her role in the family she is still just a stepmother no matter what. She must learn how to cope and be a part of their lives. Directed by Lamasan, this provocative film explores issues of love, trust and what it means to be a family.

Cast

Main cast
 Sharon Cuneta as Mariel Chavez
 Christopher de Leon as Edward Chavez
 Zsa Zsa Padilla as Sandra

Supporting cast
 Nida Blanca as Fides
 Tita Muñoz as Ninay Chavez 
 Eula Valdez as Irene
 Claudine Barretto as Rachel Chavez 
 Patrick Garcia as Ryan Chavez 
 Camille Prats as Liza Chavez 
 Rico Yan as Dodie
 Teresa Loyzaga as Luchie
 Cris Villanueva as Dan
 Koko Trinidad as Lolo
 Vangie Labalan as Manang
 Cheng Avellana as Lenlen
 Mai Guevarra as Classmate of Liza

Accolades

References

External links
 
 

Star Cinema films
Filipino-language films
Philippine drama films
1996 films
Films directed by Olivia Lamasan